Sankt-Peterburgskiy Rabochiy Listok (Saint Petersburg Workers' Paper) was an illegal newspaper of the Russian Empire, published in 1897. It was an organ of the League of Struggle for the Emancipation of the Working Class.

The newspaper published two issues, the first on February (300—400 copies were made) in Russia and the second on September, in Geneva.

References 

Newspapers published in the Russian Empire
Publications established in 1897
Publications disestablished in 1897
Mass media in Saint Petersburg
Defunct newspapers published in Russia
Russian-language newspapers